Zoegea is a genus of flowering plants in the tribe Cardueae within the family Asteraceae.

 Species
 Zoegea crinita Boiss. - Tajikistan
 Zoegea leptaurea L. - Saudi Arabia, Syria, Lebanon, Turkey
 Zoegea purpurea Fresen. - Egypt, Arabian Peninsula, Middle East, Central Asia, Indian subcontinent

References

Cynareae
Asteraceae genera
Taxa named by Carl Linnaeus